This is a list of episodes from Rolie Polie Olie.

Series overview

Episodes

Season 1 (1998)

Season 2 (1999)

Season 3 (2000–2001)

Season 4 (2001)

Season 5 (2001–2002)

Season 6 (2002–2004)

Movies

References

Lists of French animated television series episodes
Lists of Canadian children's animated television series episodes